Ku Abdul Rahman bin Ku Ismail is a Malaysian politician and currently serves as Kedah State Executive Councillor.

Election Results

Honours
  :
  Knight Companion of the Order of Loyalty to the Royal House of Kedah (DSDK) – Dato' (2004)
  Knight Commander of the Order of the Crown of Kedah (DGMK) – Dato' Wira (2017)

References 

Living people
People from Kedah
Malaysian people of Malay descent
Malaysian Muslims
Former United Malays National Organisation politicians
21st-century Malaysian politicians
Year of birth missing (living people)
 Malaysian United Indigenous Party politicians
Members of the Kedah State Legislative Assembly
 Kedah state executive councillors